In organic chemistry, a dioxazolone is a cyclic carbonate incorporated into C2NO2 ring. It is an uncommon heterocyclic compound.  They arise by the phosgenation of hydroxamic acids:
RC(O)NHOH  +  COCl2  →   RC=NO2CO  +  2 HCl
Although dioxazolones are often explosive, they are of interest as precursors to isocyanates:
RC=NO2CO  →  RC=N=O  +  CO2

Dioxazolones have attracted attention as reagents for the preparation of amides.

References

Carbonate esters
Functional groups